Hōon'in (報恩院) is a Buddhist temple in Chūō-ku, Osaka Prefecture, Japan. It was founded in the Kanbun Era, 1661–1672.

See also 
Thirteen Buddhist Sites of Osaka

External link
 Introduction

Buddhist temples in Osaka
Chūō-ku, Osaka
17th-century Buddhist temples
17th-century establishments in Japan